The 1973–74 NCAA Division I men's ice hockey season began in October 1973 and concluded with the 1974 NCAA Division I Men's Ice Hockey Tournament's championship game on March 16, 1974 at the Boston Garden in Boston, Massachusetts. This was the 27th season in which an NCAA ice hockey championship was held and is the 80th year overall where an NCAA school fielded a team.

In the summer of 1973 the NCAA changed the classifications of the tiers in each of their sponsored sports. The University- and College-divisions were done away with and replaced by numerical designations making this the first official Division I season.

The NIT held a competing ice hockey tournament for the first time. The tournament included NAIA champion Lake Superior State, ECAC 2 champion Vermont and two NCAA Division I schools (Minnesota–Duluth and Saint Louis). Minnesota–Duluth won the championship but the tournament was not renewed for a second season.

Regular season

Season tournaments

Standings

1974 NCAA Tournament

Note: * denotes overtime period(s)

Player stats

Scoring leaders
The following players led the league in points at the conclusion of the season.

GP = Games played; G = Goals; A = Assists; Pts = Points; PIM = Penalty minutes

Leading goaltenders
The following goaltenders led the league in goals against average at the end of the regular season while playing at least 33% of their team's total minutes.

GP = Games played; Min = Minutes played; W = Wins; L = Losses; OT = Overtime/shootout losses; GA = Goals against; SO = Shutouts; SV% = Save percentage; GAA = Goals against average

Awards

NCAA

CCHA

ECAC

WCHA

See also
 1973–74 NCAA Division II men's ice hockey season
 1973–74 NCAA Division III men's ice hockey season

References

External links
College Hockey Historical Archives
1973–74 NCAA Standings

 
NCAA